Bigbara is a village and gram panchayat in Rudrapur city, Udham Singh Nagar district in the Indian state of Uttarakhand. Bigbara is located in the fertile Terai region on National Highway 74, 3km  milestone from Rudrapur. Since the establishment of SIDCUL, the village has enjoyed rapid development.

The Bigbara village has population of 1729 of which 884 are males while 845 are females as per Population Census 2011.

In Bigbara village population of children with age 0-6 is 292 which makes up 16.89 % of total population of village. Average Sex Ratio of Bigbara village is 956 which is lower than Uttarakhand state average of 963. Child Sex Ratio for the Bigbara as per census is 1000, higher than Uttarakhand average of 890.

Bigbara village has lower literacy rate compared to Uttarakhand. In 2011, literacy rate of Bigbara village was 72.65 % compared to 78.82 % of Uttarakhand. In Bigbara Male literacy stands at 81.71 % while female literacy rate was 63.09 %.

As per constitution of India and Panchyati Raaj Act, Bigbara village is administrated by Sarpanch (Head of Village) who is elected representative of village.

Lifestyle
The fertile land lends itself to different forms of agriculture, giving rise to agriculture-related activities and industry, making this land a green place which has resulted in prosperity all around.

Accessibility
The nearest Airport is at Pantnagar. Bigwara is well connected by road with all the major cities of the state and region. Delhi is at a distance of 234km whereas Nainital is just 75km away. The place is a junction of roads heading in four directions, one towards Kashipur and beyond to Haridwar, the other to Nainital, the third towards Kichha leading to Bareilly and Lucknow and the last one heading towards the national capital, New Delhi.

Residential zone
Since the establishment of SIDCUL, the village has enjoyed rapid development and many companies have establish townships and residential projects in village Bigwara.

Villages in Udham Singh Nagar district